Giovanni Mastel (6 May 1943 – 21 December 2021) was an Italian ice hockey player. He competed in the men's tournament at the 1964 Winter Olympics. Mastel died on 21 December 2021, at the age of 78.

References

External links
 

1943 births
2021 deaths
Olympic ice hockey players of Italy
Ice hockey players at the 1964 Winter Olympics
People from Belluno
Sportspeople from the Province of Belluno